Jack Carr (born July 3, 1975 in Saint John, New Brunswick) is a politician in the province of New Brunswick, Canada. He was elected to the Legislative Assembly of New Brunswick in a byelection on November 3, 2008, as the Progressive Conservative MLA for New Maryland-Sunbury West.

He is the twin brother of his caucus colleague Jody Carr.

He did not run for reelection in the 2014 provincial election. His older brother Jeff Carr was named as the Progressive Conservative candidate in New Maryland-Sunbury, and won the election.

References

External links
PC Party of New Brunswick biography

1975 births
Progressive Conservative Party of New Brunswick MLAs
Living people
Politicians from Saint John, New Brunswick
Canadian twins
21st-century Canadian politicians